E. Alice Taylor (1892–January 1, 1986, age 94) was an African-American entrepreneur, teacher, and community organizer who was an officer and board member of the Boston, Massachusetts NAACP for 50 years. In 1927 she founded a branch of Annie Malone's Poro School and Beauty Shoppe, which she ran for 15 years, until it was closed at the start of World War II. The school had grown to become one of New England's largest minority-owned businesses, with a staff of 15 teaching 150 students each year. She was a member of numerous community service organizations.

References

Sources

 
 
 

1892 births
1986 deaths
NAACP activists
African-American history in Boston
Businesspeople from Boston
African-American schoolteachers
Schoolteachers from Massachusetts
20th-century American women educators
20th-century American businesspeople
African-American businesspeople
Activists from Massachusetts
American education businesspeople
20th-century American educators
Arkansas Baptist College alumni
20th-century African-American women
20th-century African-American educators